Tomčić is a surname. Notable people with the surname include:

 Zlatko Tomčić (born 1942), Croatian politician
 Zoran Tomčić (born 1970), Croatian footballer

Croatian surnames